Matthew Rea (10 April 1873 – 10 November 1942) was an Irish Gaelic footballer. His championship career at senior level with the Dublin county team lasted two seasons from 1898 until 1899.

Born in Glenroe, County Limerick, Rea was born to David and Mary Rea (née Keating). He was educated locally before moving to Dublin where he worked as a civil servant.

After moving to Dublin, Rea helped establish the Geraldines club in 1896. As well as being a founder-member he also became a regular member of the senior team and won back-to-back county football championship medals in 1898 and 1899.

Rea made his debut on the inter-county scene as a member of the Dublin senior football team during the 1898 championship. As captain of the team he won back-to-back All-Ireland medals in 1898 and 1899. Rea also won two Leinster medals.

Rea died from mouth cancer at the age of 69 on 10 November 1942. His grandnephew, Ned Rea, was an All-Ireland medal winner as a hurler with Limerick.

Honours
Geraldines
Dublin Senior Football Championship (2): 1898, 1899

Dublin
All-Ireland Senior Football Championship (2): 1898 (c), 1899 (c)
Leinster Senior Football Championship (1): 1898 (c), 1899 (c)

References

1873 births
1942 deaths
Deaths from cancer in the Republic of Ireland
Dublin inter-county Gaelic footballers
Irish civil servants
Deaths from oral cancer